August Wester, Jr. (February 12, 1882 – September 1960) was an American wrestler who competed in the 1904 Summer Olympics. He won a silver medal in bantamweight category. He was born in Newark, New Jersey.

References

External links
August Wester's profile at databaseOlympics
August Wester's profile at Sports Reference.com

1882 births
1960 deaths
Wrestlers at the 1904 Summer Olympics
American male sport wrestlers
Olympic silver medalists for the United States in wrestling
Medalists at the 1904 Summer Olympics